The Ta Chia-Hsi Revolt (also Taikasei revolt) of 1731-32 was a major aboriginal revolt on Formosa, which saw the Taokas tribe take up arms against the Qing authorities following a series of issues with the corvee labor policy. The Taokas swept southward and were joined by other plains aboriginal groups, stopping to lay siege to the walled city of Changhua. The revolt ended following the Qing enlisting the help of the An-li tribe and Green Standard troops from the south.

 Davidson (1903) The Island of Formosa, Past and Present. https://archive.org/details/islandofformosap00davi

References

Conflicts in 1731
Conflicts in 1732
Rebellions in Asia
History of Taiwan
18th century in Taiwan
Taiwan under Qing rule
1731 in Taiwan
1732 in Taiwan
Military history of Taiwan